Tarocco may refer to:

 Tarocco, a Renaissance card game using tarot cards
 Tarocco Piemontese, a type of tarot deck used to play a surviving variant of the game
 Tarocco Bolognese, a type of tarot deck used to play Tarocchini, another surviving variant popular in Bologna
 Tarocco Siciliano, a type of tarot deck found in Sicily
 An Italian variant cultivar of the Blood orange